IWN may refer to:

 Israel Women's Network
 Indigenous Women's Network
 International Workshop on Nitride Semiconductors
 Inland Waterway News